Asteroid impact prediction is the prediction of the dates and times of asteroids impacting Earth, along with the locations and severities of the impacts.

The process of impact prediction follows three major steps:
 Discovery of an asteroid and initial assessment of its orbit which is generally based on a short observation arc of less than 2 weeks.
 Follow up observations to improve the orbit determination
 Calculating if, when and where the orbit may intersect with Earth at some point in the future.
In addition, although not strictly part of the prediction process, once an impact has been predicted, an appropriate response needs to be made.

Most asteroids are discovered by a camera on a telescope with a wide field of view. Image differencing software compares a recent image with earlier ones of the same part of the sky, detecting objects that have moved, brightened, or appeared. Those systems usually obtain a few observations per night, which can be linked up into a very preliminary orbit determination. This predicts approximate positions over the next few nights, and follow up can then be carried out by any telescope powerful enough to see the newly detected object. Orbit intersection calculations are then carried out by two independent systems, one (Sentry) run by NASA and the other (NEODyS) by ESA.

Current systems only detect an arriving object when several factors are just right, mainly the direction of approach relative to the Sun, the weather, and phase of the Moon. The result is a low overall rate of success (around 1%) which is worse the smaller the objects are. A few near misses by medium-size asteroids have been predicted years in advance, with a tiny chance of actually striking Earth, and a handful of small actual impactors have successfully been detected hours in advance. All of the latter struck wilderness or ocean, and hurt no one. The majority of impacts are by small, undiscovered objects. They rarely hit a populated area, but can cause widespread damage when they do. Performance is improving in detecting smaller objects as existing systems are upgraded, and new ones come on line, but the blind spot issue which all current systems face around the Sun can only be overcome by a dedicated space based system or by discovering objects on a previous approach to Earth many years before a potential impact.

History 
In 1992 a report to NASA recommended a coordinated survey (christened Spaceguard) to discover, verify and provide follow-up observations for Earth-crossing asteroids. This survey was scaled to discover 90% of all objects larger than one kilometer within 25 years. Three years later, a further NASA report recommended search surveys that would discover 60–70% of the short-period, near-Earth objects larger than one kilometer within ten years and obtain 90% completeness within five more years.

In 1998, NASA formally embraced the goal of finding and cataloging, by 2008, 90% of all near-Earth objects (NEOs) with diameters of 1 km or larger that could represent a collision risk to Earth. The 1 km diameter metric was chosen after considerable study indicated that an impact of an object smaller than 1 km could cause significant local or regional damage but is unlikely to cause a worldwide catastrophe. The impact of an object much larger than 1 km diameter could well result in worldwide damage up to, and potentially including, extinction of the human race. The NASA commitment has resulted in the funding of a number of NEO search efforts, which made considerable progress toward the 90% goal by the target date of 2008 and also produced the first ever successful prediction of an asteroid impact (the 4-meter  was detected 19 hours before impact). However, the 2009 discovery of several NEOs approximately 2 to 3 kilometers in diameter (e.g.

Three years later, in 2012, the small asteroid 367943 Duende was discovered and successfully predicted to be on close but non-colliding approach to Earth again just 11 months later. This was a landmark prediction as the object was only , and it was closely monitored as a result. On the day of its closest approach and by coincidence, a smaller asteroid was also approaching Earth, unpredicted and undetected, from a direction close to the Sun. Unlike 367943 Duende it was on a collision course and it impacted Earth 16 hours before 367943 Duende passed, becoming the Chelyabinsk meteor. It injured 1,500 people and damaged over 7,000 buildings, raising the profile of the dangers of even small asteroid impacts if they occur over populated areas. The asteroid is estimated to have been 17 m across.

In April 2018, the B612 Foundation stated "It's 100 per cent certain we'll be hit [by a devastating asteroid], but we're not 100 per cent sure when." Also in 2018, physicist Stephen Hawking, in his final book Brief Answers to the Big Questions, considered an asteroid collision to be the biggest threat to the planet. In June 2018, the US National Science and Technology Council warned that America is unprepared for an asteroid impact event, and has developed and released the National Near-Earth Object Preparedness Strategy Action Plan to better prepare.

Discovery of near-Earth asteroids 
The first step in predicting impacts is detecting asteroids and determining their orbits. Finding faint near-Earth objects against the much more numerous background stars is very much a needle in a haystack search. It is achieved by sky surveys that are designed to discover near Earth asteroids. Unlike the majority of telescopes that have a narrow field of view and high magnification, survey telescopes have a wide field of view to scan the entire sky in a reasonable amount of time with enough sensitivity to pick up the faint near-Earth objects they are searching for.

NEO focused surveys revisit the same area of sky several times in succession. Movement can then be detected using image differencing techniques. Anything that moves from image to image against the background of stars is compared to a catalogue of all known objects, and if it is not already known is reported as a new discovery along with its precise position and the observation time. This then allows other observers to confirm and add to the data about the newly discovered object.

Cataloging vs warning surveys 
Asteroid surveys can be classified as either cataloging surveys, which use larger telescopes to mostly identify larger asteroids well before they come notably close to Earth, or warning surveys, which use smaller telescopes to mostly look for smaller asteroids within several million kilometers of Earth. Cataloging systems focus on finding larger asteroids years in advance and they scan the sky slowly (of the order of once per month), but deeply. Warning systems focus on scanning the sky relatively quickly (of the order of once per night). They typically cannot detect objects that are as faint as cataloging systems but they will not miss an asteroid that dramatically brightens for just a few days when it passes very close to Earth. Some systems compromise and scan the sky approximately once per week.

Cataloging systems
For larger asteroids (> 100 m to 1 km across), prediction is based on cataloging the asteroid, years to centuries before it could impact. This technique is possible as their size makes them bright enough to be seen from a long distance. Their orbits therefore can be measured and any future impacts predicted long before they are on an impact approach to Earth. This long period of warning is important as an impact from a 1 km object would cause worldwide damage and around a decade of lead time would be needed to deflect it away from Earth. As of 2018, the inventory is nearly complete for the kilometer-size objects (around 900) which would cause global damage, and approximately one third complete for 140 meter objects (around 8500) which would cause major regional damage. The effectiveness of the cataloging is somewhat limited by the fact that some proportion of the objects have been lost since their discovery, due to insufficient observations to accurately determine their orbits.

Warning systems
Smaller near-Earth objects number into millions and therefore impact Earth much more often, though obviously with much less damage. The vast majority remain undiscovered. They seldom pass close enough to Earth that they become bright enough to observe, and so most can only be observed when within several million kilometers of Earth. They therefore cannot usually be cataloged well in advance and can only be warned about, a few weeks to days in advance. This is much too late to deflect them away from Earth, but is enough time to mitigate the consequences of the impact by evacuating and otherwise preparing the affected area. Warning systems can also detect asteroids which have been successfully catalogued as existing, but whose orbit is insufficiently well determined to allow a prediction of where they are now. 

Current mechanisms for detecting asteroids on approach rely on ground based telescopes with wide fields of view. Those currently can monitor the sky at most every second night, and therefore miss most of the smaller asteroids which are bright enough to detect for less than two days. Such very small asteroids much more commonly impact Earth than larger ones, but they make little damage. Missing them therefore has limited consequences. Much more importantly, ground-based telescopes are blind to most of the asteroids which impact the day side of the planet and will miss even large ones. These and other problems mean very few impacts are successfully predicted (see §Effectiveness of the current system and §Improving impact prediction).

Surveys 

The main NEO focussed surveys are listed below, along with future telescopes that are already funded.

Originally all the surveys were clustered together in a relatively small part of the Northern Hemisphere. This meant that around 15% of the sky at extreme Southern declination was never monitored, and that the rest of the Southern sky was observed over a shorter season than the Northern sky. Moreover, as the hours of darkness are fewer in summertime, the lack of a balance of surveys between North and South meant that the sky was scanned less often in the Northern summer. The ATLAS telescopes now operating at the South African Astronomical Observatory and El Sauce observatory in Chile now cover this gap in the south east of the globe. Once it is completed, the Large Synoptic Survey Telescope will improve the existing cover of the southern sky. The 3.5 m Space Surveillance Telescope, which was originally also in the southwest United States, was dismantled and moved to Western Australia in 2017. When completed, this should also improve the global coverage. Construction has been delayed due to the new site being in a cyclone region, but was completed in September 2022.

ATLAS 

ATLAS, the "Asteroid Terrestrial-impact Last Alert System" uses four 0.5-metre telescopes located at Haleakala and Mauna Loa on two of the Hawaiian Islands, one at the South African Astronomical Observatory, and one in Chile. With a field of view of 30 square degrees each, the telescopes survey the observable sky down to apparent magnitude 19 with 4 exposures every night. The survey has been fully operational with these two telescopes since 2017, and in 2018 obtained NASA funding for two additional telescopes. Both are sited in the Southern hemisphere. They were expected to take 18 months to build. Their southern locations provide coverage of the 15% of the sky that cannot be observed from Hawaii, and combined with the Northern hemisphere telescopes give non-stop coverage of the equatorial night sky (the South African location is not only in the opposite hemisphere, but also at an opposing longitude). The full ATLAS concept consists of eight 50-centimeter diameter f/2 Wright-Schmidt telescopes, spread over the globe for full-night-sky and 24h/24h coverage.

Catalina Sky Survey (including Mount Lemmon Survey)

In 1998, the Catalina Sky Survey (CSS) took over from Spacewatch in surveying the sky for the University of Arizona. It uses two telescopes, a 1.5 m Cassegrain reflector telescope on the peak of Mount Lemmon (also known as a survey in its own right, the Mount Lemmon Survey), and a 0.7 m Schmidt telescope near Mount Bigelow (both in the Tucson, Arizona area in the south west of the United States). Both sites use identical cameras which provide a field of view of 5 square degrees on the 1.5 m telescope and 19 square degrees on the Catalina Schmidt. The Cassegrain reflector telescope takes three to four weeks to survey the entire sky, detecting objects fainter than apparent magnitude 21.5. The 0.7 m telescope takes a week to complete a survey of the sky, detecting objects fainter than apparent magnitude 19. This combination of telescopes, one slow and one medium, has so far detected more near Earth Objects than any other single survey. This shows the need for a combination of different types of telescopes.

CSS used to include a telescope in the Southern Hemisphere, the Siding Spring Survey. However operations ended in 2013 after funding was discontinued.

Kiso Observatory (Tomo-e Gozen) 

The Kiso Observatory uses a 1.05m Schmidt telescope on Mt. Ontake near Tokyo in Japan. In late 2019 the Kiso Observatory added a new instrument to the telescope, "Tomo-e Gozen", designed to detect fast moving and rapidly changing objects. It has a wide field of view (20 square degrees) and scans the sky in just 2 hours, far faster than any other survey as of 2021. This puts it squarely in the warning survey category. In order to scan the sky so quickly, the camera captures 2 frames per second, which means the sensitivity is lower than other metre class telescopes (which have much longer exposure times), giving a limiting magnitude of just 18. However, despite not being able to see dimmer objects which are detectable by other surveys, the ability to scan the entire sky several times per night allows it to spot fast moving asteroids that other surveys miss. It has discovered a significant number of near earth asteroids as a result (for example see List of asteroid close approaches to Earth in 2021).

Large Synoptic Survey Telescope 

The Large Synoptic Survey Telescope (LSST) is a wide-field survey reflecting telescope with an 8.4 meter primary mirror, currently under construction on Cerro Pachón in Chile. It will survey the entire available sky around every three nights. Science operations are due to begin in 2022. Scanning the sky relatively fast but also being able to detect objects down to apparent magnitude 27, it should be good at detecting nearby fast moving objects as well as excellent for larger slower objects that are currently further away.

Near-Earth Object Surveillance Mission 

A planned space-based 0.5m infrared telescope designed to survey the Solar System for potentially hazardous asteroids. The telescope will use a passive cooling system, and so unlike its predecessor NEOWISE, it will not suffer from a performance degradation due to running out of coolant. It does still have a limited mission duration however as it needs to use propellant for orbital station keeping in order to maintain its position at SEL1. From here, the mission will search for asteroids hidden from earth based satellites by the sun's glare. It is planned for launch in 2026.

NEO Survey Telescope 

The Near Earth Object Survey TELescope (NEOSTEL) is an ESA funded project, starting with an initial prototype currently under construction. The telescope is of a new "fly-eye" design that combines a single reflector with multiple sets of optics and CCDs, giving a very wide field of view (around 45 square degrees). When complete it will have the widest field of view of any telescope and will be able to survey the majority of the visible sky in a single night. If the initial prototype is successful, three more telescopes are planned for installation around the globe. Because of the novel design, the size of the primary mirror is not directly comparable to more conventional telescopes, but is equivalent to a conventional 1–metre telescope.

The telescope itself should be complete by end of 2019, and installation on Mount Mufara, Sicily should be complete in 2020 but was pushed back to 2022.

NEOWISE 

The Wide-field Infrared Survey Explorer is a 0.4 m infrared-wavelength space telescope launched in December 2009, and placed in hibernation in February 2011. It was re-activated in 2013 specifically to search for near-Earth objects under the NEOWISE mission. By this stage, the spacecraft's cryogenic coolant had been depleted and so only two of the spacecraft's four sensors could be used. Whilst this has still led to new discoveries of asteroids not previously seen from ground-based telescopes, the productivity has dropped significantly. In its peak year when all four sensors were operational, WISE made 2.28 million asteroid observations. In recent years, with no cryogen, NEOWISE typically makes approximately 0.15 million asteroid observations annually. The next generation of infrared space telescopes has been designed so that they do not need cryogenic cooling.

Pan-STARRS 

Pan-STARRS, the "Panoramic Survey Telescope And Rapid Response System", currently (2018) consists of two 1.8 m Ritchey–Chrétien telescopes located at Haleakala in Hawaii. It has discovered a large number of new asteroids, comets, variable stars, supernovae and other celestial objects. Its primary mission is now to detect near-Earth objects that threaten impact events, and it is expected to create a database of all objects visible from Hawaii (three-quarters of the entire sky) down to apparent magnitude 24. The Pan-STARRS NEO survey searches all the sky north of declination −47.5. It takes three to four weeks to survey the entire sky.

Space Surveillance Telescope 

The Space Surveillance Telescope (SST) is a 3.5 m telescope that detects, tracks, and can discern small, obscure objects, in deep space with a wide field of view system. The SST mount uses an advanced servo-control technology, that makes it one of the quickest and most agile telescopes of its size. It has a field of view of 6 square degrees and can scan the visible sky in 6 clear nights down to apparent magnitude 20.5. Its primary mission is tracking orbital debris. This task is similar to that of spotting near-Earth asteroids and so it is capable of both.

The SST was initially deployed for testing and evaluation at the White Sands Missile Range in New Mexico. On 6 December 2013, it was announced that the telescope system would be moved to the Naval Communication Station Harold E. Holt in Exmouth, Western Australia. The SST was moved to Australia in 2017, captured first light in 2020 and after a two and a half year testing programme became operational in September 2022.

Spacewatch 

Spacewatch was an early sky survey focussed on finding near Earth asteroids, founded in 1980. It was the first to use CCD image sensors to search for them, and the first to develop software to detect moving objects automatically in real-time. This led to a huge increase in productivity. Before 1990 a few hundred observations were made each year. After automation, annual productivity jumped by a factor of 100 leading to tens of thousands of observations per year. This paved the way for the surveys we have today.

Although the survey is still in operation, in 1998 it was superseded by Catalina Sky Survey. Since then it has focused on following up on discoveries by other surveys, rather than making new discoveries itself. In particular it aims to prevent high priority PHOs from being lost after their discovery. The survey telescopes are 1.8 m and 0.9 m. The two follow up telescopes are 2.3 m and 4 m.

Zwicky Transient Facility 

The Zwicky Transient Facility (ZTF) was commissioned in 2018, superseding the Intermediate Palomar Transient Factory (2009–2017). It is designed to detect transient objects that rapidly change in brightness as well as moving objects, for example supernovae, gamma ray bursts, collisions between two neutron stars, comets and asteroids. The ZTF is a 1.2 m telescope that has a field of view of 47 square degrees, designed to image the entire northern sky in three nights and scan the plane of the Milky Way twice each night to a limiting magnitude of 20.5. The amount of data produced by ZTF is expected to be 10 times larger than its predecessor.

Follow up observations 

Once a new asteroid has been discovered and reported, other observers can confirm the finding and help define the orbit of the newly discovered object. The International Astronomical Union Minor Planet Center (MPC) acts as the global clearing house for information on asteroid orbits. It publishes lists of new discoveries that need verifying and still have uncertain orbits, and it accepts the resulting follow up observations from around the world. Unlike the initial discovery, which typically requires unusual and expensive wide-field telescopes, ordinary telescopes can be used to confirm the object as its position is now approximately known. There are far more of these around the globe, and even a well equipped amateur astronomer can contribute valuable follow-up observations of moderately bright asteroids. For example, the Great Shefford Observatory in the back garden of amateur Peter Birtwhistle typically submits thousands of observations to the Minor Planet Center every year. Nonetheless, some surveys (for example CSS and Spacewatch) have their own dedicated follow up telescopes.

Follow up observations are important because once a sky survey has reported a discovery it may not return to observe the object again for days or weeks. By this time it may be too faint for it to detect, and in danger of becoming a lost asteroid. The more observations and the longer the observation arc, the greater the accuracy of the orbit model. This is important for two reasons:

 for imminent impacts it helps to make a better prediction of where the impact will occur and whether there is any danger of hitting a populated area.
 for asteroids that will miss Earth this time round, the more accurate the orbit model is, the further into the future its position can be predicted. This allows recovery of the asteroid on its subsequent approaches, and impacts to be predicted years in advance.

Estimating size and impact severity 
Assessing the size of the asteroid is important for predicting the severity of the impact, and therefore the actions that need to be taken (if any). With just observations of reflected visible light by a conventional telescope, the object could be anything from 50% to 200% of the estimated diameter, and therefore anything from one-eighth to eight times the estimated volume and mass. Because of this, one key follow up observation is to measure the asteroid in the thermal infrared spectrum (long-wavelength infrared), using an infrared telescope. The amount of thermal radiation given off by an asteroid together with the amount of reflected visible light allows a much more accurate assessment of its size than just how bright it appears in the visible spectrum. Jointly using thermal infrared and visible measurements, a thermal model of the asteroid can estimate its size to within about 10% of the true size.

One example of such a follow up observation was for 3671 Dionysus by UKIRT, the world's largest infrared telescope at the time (1997). A second example was the 2013 ESA Herschel Space Observatory follow up observations of 99942 Apophis, which showed it was 20% larger and 75% more massive than previously estimated. However such follow-ups are rare. The size estimates of most near-Earth asteroids are based on visible light only.

If the object was discovered by an infrared survey telescope initially, then an accurate size estimate will already be available, and infrared follow up will not be needed. However none of the ground-based survey telescopes listed above operate at thermal infrared wavelengths. The NEOWISE satellite had two thermal infrared sensors but they stopped working when the cryogen ran out. There are therefore currently no active thermal infrared sky surveys which are focused on discovering near-Earth objects. There are plans for a new space based thermal infrared survey telescope, Near-Earth Object Surveillance Mission, due to launch in 2025.

Impact calculation

Minimum orbit intersection distance 

The minimum orbit intersection distance (MOID) between an asteroid and the Earth is the distance between the closest points of their orbits. This first check is a coarse measure that does not allow an impact prediction to be made, but is based solely on the orbit parameters and gives an initial measure of how close to Earth the asteroid could come. If the MOID is large then the two objects never come near each other. In this case, unless the orbit of the asteroid is perturbed so that the MOID is reduced at some point in the future, it will never impact Earth and can be ignored. However, if the MOID is small then it is necessary to carry out more detailed calculations to determine if an impact will happen in the future. Asteroids with a MOID of less than 0.05 AU and an absolute magnitude brighter than 22 are categorized as a potentially hazardous asteroid.

Projecting into the future 

Once the initial orbit is known, the potential positions can be forecast years into the future and compared to the future position of Earth. If the distance between the asteroid and the centre of the Earth is less than Earth radius then a potential impact is predicted. To take account of the uncertainties in the orbit of the asteroid, several future projections are made (simulations). Each simulation has slightly different parameters within the range of the uncertainty. This allows a percentage chance of impact to be estimated. For example, if 1,000 simulations are carried out and 73 result in an impact, then the prediction would be a 7.3% chance of impact.

NEODyS 

NEODyS (Near Earth Objects Dynamic Site) is a European Space Agency service that provides information on near Earth objects. It is based on a continually and (almost) automatically maintained database of near earth asteroid orbits. The site provides a number of services to the NEO community. The main service is an impact monitoring system (CLOMON2) of all near-Earth asteroids covering a period until the year 2100.

The NEODyS website includes a Risk Page where all NEOs with probabilities of hitting the Earth greater than 10−11 from now until 2100 are shown in a risk list. In the table of the risk list the NEOs are divided into:
 "special", as was the case of (99942) Apophis
 "observable", objects which are presently observable and which critically need a follow up in order to improve their orbit
 "possible recovery", objects which are not visible at present, but which are possible to recover in the near future
 "lost", objects which have an absolute magnitude (H) brighter than 25 but which are virtually lost, their orbit being too uncertain; and
 "small", objects with an absolute magnitude fainter than 25; even when those are "lost", they are considered too small to result in heavy damage on the ground (though the Chelyabinsk meteor would have been fainter than this).

Each object has its own impactor table (IT) which shows many parameters useful to determine the risk assessment.

Sentry prediction system 

NASA's Sentry System continually scans the MPC catalog of known asteroids, analyzing their orbits for any possible future impacts. Like ESA's NEODyS, it gives a list of possible future impacts, along with the probability of each. It uses a slightly different algorithm to NEODyS, and so provides a useful cross-check and corroboration.

Currently, no impacts are predicted (the single highest probability impact currently listed is ~7 m asteroid , which is due to pass Earth in September 2095 with only a 10% predicted chance of impacting; its size is also small enough that any damage from an impact would be minimal).

Impact probability calculation pattern 

The ellipses in the diagram on the right show the predicted position of an example asteroid at closest Earth approach. At first, with only a few asteroid observations, the error ellipse is very large and includes the Earth. Further observations shrink the error ellipse, but it still includes the Earth. This raises the predicted impact probability, since the Earth now covers a larger fraction of the error region.  Finally, yet more observations (often radar observations, or discovery of a previous sighting of the same asteroid on archival images) shrink the ellipse revealing that the Earth is outside the smaller error region, and the impact probability is then near zero.

For asteroids that are actually on track to hit Earth, the predicted probability of impact never stops increasing as more observations are made. This initially very similar pattern makes it difficult to quickly differentiate between asteroids which will be millions of kilometres from Earth and those which will actually hit it. This in turn makes it difficult to decide when to raise an alarm as gaining more certainty takes time, which reduces the time available to react to a predicted impact. However raising the alarm too soon has the danger of causing a false alarm and creating a Boy Who Cried Wolf effect if the asteroid in fact misses Earth. NASA will raise an alert if an asteroid has a better than 1% chance of impacting.

In December 2004 when Apophis was estimated to have a 2.7% chance of impacting Earth on 13 April 2029, the uncertainty region for this asteroid had shrunk to 82,818 km.

Response to predicted impact 
Once an impact has been predicted the potential severity needs to be assessed, and a response plan formed. Depending on the time to impact and the predicted severity this may be as simple as giving a warning to citizens. For example, although unpredicted, the 2013
impact at Chelyabinsk was spotted through the window by teacher Yulia Karbysheva. She thought it prudent to take precautionary measures by ordering her students to stay away from the room's windows and to perform a duck and cover maneuver. The teacher, who remained standing, was seriously lacerated when the blast arrived and window glass severed a tendon in one of her arms and left thigh, but none of her students, whom she ordered to hide under their desks, suffered lacerations. If the impact had been predicted and a warning had been given to the entire population, similar simple precautionary actions could have vastly reduced the number of injuries. Children who were not in her class were injured.

If a more severe impact is predicted, the response may require evacuation of the area, or with sufficient lead time available, an avoidance mission to repel the asteroid. According to expert testimony in the United States Congress in 2013, NASA would require at least five years of preparation before a mission to intercept an asteroid could be launched which was demonstrated by kinetically deflecting a minor planet moon , non-hazardous NEO Asteroid called Dimorphos with the help of Dart spacecraft. The collision successfully decreased Dimorphos's orbital period around Didymos by  minutes.

Effectiveness of the current system 
The effectiveness of the current system can be assessed a number of ways. The diagram below illustrates the number of successfully predicted impacts each year compared to the number of unpredicted asteroid impacts recorded by infrasound sensors designed to detect detonation of nuclear devices. It shows that the success rate is increasing over time, but that the vast majority are still missed.

One problem with assessing effectiveness this way is that the missed asteroids tend to be small. Missing small asteroids is unimportant as they generally do very little damage (the mid-size unpredicted Chelyabinsk meteor being a notable exception). However, missing a large day-side impacting asteroid is highly problematic. In order to assess the effectiveness for detecting larger asteroids, a different approach is needed.

Another way to assess the effectiveness is to look at warning times for asteroids which did not impact Earth, but came reasonably close. Looking at asteroids which came closer than the Moon, the below diagram shows how far in advance of closest approach the asteroids were first detected. Unlike actual asteroid impacts where, by using infrasound sensors, it is possible to assess how many were undetected, there is no ground truth for close approaches. The below chart therefore does not include any statistics for asteroids which went completely undetected. It can be seen however that about half of the asteroids that were detected, were not detected until after they had passed Earth. That is to say, if they had been on an impact trajectory, they would have been undetected before impact. This includes larger asteroids such as 2018 AH, which wasn't detected until 2 days after it had passed, and is estimated to be around 100 times more massive than the Chelyabinsk meteor.

It is worth noting that the number of detections is increasing as more survey sites come on line (for example ATLAS in 2016 and ZTF in 2018), and that approximately half of the detections are made after the asteroid passes the Earth. The below charts visualise the warning times of the close approaches listed in the above bargraph, by the size of the asteroid instead of the year they occurred in. The sizes of the charts show the relative sizes of the asteroids to scale. For comparison, the approximate size of a person is also shown. This is based the absolute magnitude of each asteroid, an approximate measure of size based on brightness.

Abs Magnitude 30 and greater
 (size of a person for comparison)

Abs Magnitude 29–30

Absolute Magnitude 28–29

Absolute Magnitude 27–28

Absolute Magnitude 26–27

(probable size of the Chelyabinsk meteor)

Absolute Magnitude 25–26

Absolute Magnitude less than 25 (largest)

It can be seen that since the early years of the 21st century there has been a significant improvement in the ability to predict larger asteroids, with some now being catalogued (predicted more than 1 year in advance), or having usable early warning times (greater than a week).

One final statistic which casts some light on the effectiveness of the current system is the average warning time for an asteroid impact. Based on the few successfully predicted asteroid impacts, the average time between initial detection and impact is currently around 4 hours. Note however that there is some delay between the initial observation of the asteroid, data submission, and the follow up observations and calculations which lead to an impact prediction being made.

Improving impact prediction 
In addition to the already-funded telescopes mentioned above, two separate approaches have been suggested by NASA to improve impact prediction. Both approaches focus on the first step in impact prediction (discovering near-Earth asteroids) as this is the largest weakness in the current system. The first approach uses more powerful ground-based telescopes similar to the LSST.  Being ground-based, such telescopes will still only observe part of the sky around Earth. In particular, all ground-based telescopes have a large blind spot for any asteroids coming from the direction of the Sun. In addition, they are affected by weather conditions, airglow and the phase of the Moon.

To get around all of these issues, the second approach suggested is the use of space-based telescopes which can observe a much larger region of the sky around Earth. Although they still cannot point directly towards the Sun, they do not have the problem of blue sky to overcome and so can detect asteroids much closer in the sky to the Sun than ground-based telescopes. Unaffected by weather or airglow they can also operate 24 hours per day all year round. Finally, telescopes in space have the advantage of being able to use infrared sensors without the interference of the Earth's atmosphere. These sensors are better for detecting asteroids than optical sensors, and although there are some ground based infrared telescopes such as UKIRT, they are not designed for detecting asteroids. Space-based telescopes are more expensive, however, and tend to have a shorter lifespan. Therefore, Earth-based and space-based technologies complement each other to an extent. Although the majority of the IR spectrum is blocked by Earth's atmosphere, the very useful thermal (long-wavelength infrared) frequency band is not blocked (see gap at 10 μm in the diagram below). This allows for the possibility of ground based thermal imaging surveys designed for detecting near earth asteroids, though none are currently planned.

Opposition effect 
There is a further issue that even telescopes in Earth orbit do not overcome (unless they operate in the thermal infrared spectrum). This is the issue of illumination. Asteroids go through phases similar to the lunar phases. Even though a telescope in orbit may have an unobstructed view of an object that is close in the sky to the Sun, it will still be looking at the dark side of the object. This is because the Sun is shining primarily on the side facing away from the Earth, as is the case with the Moon when it is in a new moon phase. Because of this opposition effect, objects are far less bright in these phases than when fully illuminated, which makes them difficult to detect (see chart and diagram below).

{|
|

This problem can be solved by the use of thermal infrared surveys (either ground based or space based). Ordinary telescopes depend on observing light reflected from the Sun, which is why the opposition effect occurs. Telescopes which detect thermal infrared light depend only on the temperature of the object. Its thermal glow can be detected from any angle, and is particularly useful for differentiating asteroids from the background stars, which have a different thermal signature.

This problem can also be solved without using thermal infrared, by positioning a space telescope away from Earth, closer to the Sun. The telescope can then look back towards Earth from the same direction as the Sun, and any asteroids closer to Earth than the telescope will then be in opposition, and much better illuminated. There is a point between the Earth and Sun where the gravities of the two bodies are perfectly in balance, called the Sun-Earth L1 Lagrange point (SEL1). One problem with this position is Earth glare. Looking outward from SEL1, Earth itself is at full brightness, which prevents a telescope situated there from seeing that area of sky. Fortunately, this is the same area of sky that ground-based telescopes are best at spotting asteroids in, so the two complement each other.

Another possible position for a space telescope would be even closer to the Sun, for example in a Venus-like orbit. This would give a wider view of Earth orbit, but at a greater distance. Unlike a telescope at the SEL1 Lagrange point, it would not stay in sync with Earth but would orbit the Sun at a similar rate to Venus. Because of this, it would not often be in a position to provide any warning of asteroids shortly before impact, but it would be in a good position to catalog objects before they are on final approach, especially those which primarily orbit closer to the Sun. One issue with being as close to the Sun as Venus is that the craft may be too warm to use infrared wavelengths. A second issue would be communications. As the telescope will be a long way from Earth for most of the year (and even behind the Sun at some points) communication would often be slow and at times impossible, without expensive improvements to the Deep Space Network.

Solutions to problems: summary table 
This table summarises which of the various problems encountered by current telescopes are solved by the various different solutions.

Near-Earth Object Surveillance Mission 

In 2017, NASA proposed a number of alternative solutions to detect 90% of near-Earth objects of size 140 m or larger over the next few decades, which will also improve detection rates for the smaller objects which impact Earth more often. Several of the proposals use a combination of an improved ground-based telescope and a space-based telescope positioned at the SEL1 Lagrange point. A number of large ground based telescopes are already in the late stages of construction (see above). A space based mission situated at SEL1, NEOSM has now also been funded. It is planned for launch in 2026.

List of successfully predicted asteroid impacts 

Below is the list of all near-Earth objects which have or may have impacted the Earth and which were predicted beforehand. This list would also include any objects identified as having greater than 50% chance of impacting in the future, but no such future impacts are predicted at this time. As asteroid detection ability increases it is expected that prediction will become more successful in the future.

In addition to these objects, the meteoroid CNEOS20200918 was found in 2022 in archival ATLAS data, imaged 10 minutes before its 2020/09/18 impact. Although it technically could have been discovered before impact, it was only noticed in retrospect.

See also 
 Earth-grazing fireball
 List of asteroid close approaches to Earth
 List of bolidesasteroids and meteoroids that impacted Earth

Notes

References

External links
 Earth Impact Database
 Earth Impact Effects Program
 NASA JPL Predicted Close Approaches (including impacts)

Astronomical events
Impact events
Lists of asteroids
Near-Earth asteroids
Planetary defense